Walter Yonge may refer to:

Walter Yonge (died 1649) (1579–1649), English lawyer, merchant and diarist
Sir Walter Yonge, 2nd Baronet (c.1625–1670), English MP, grandson of the above
Sir Walter Yonge, 3rd Baronet (1653–1731), British MP, son of the above

See also
Walter Young (disambiguation)